Lucky Young Lady (Swedish: Ung dam med tur) is a 1941 Swedish comedy film directed by Ragnar Arvedson and starring Sonja Wigert, Karl-Arne Holmsten and Dagmar Ebbesen. It was shot at the Sundbyberg Studios in Stockholm and on location in Visby. The film's sets were designed by the art director Max Linder.

Synopsis
Eva, an office worker, discovers that she has unexpectedly inherited a large amount of money in the United States.

Cast
 Sonja Wigert as 	Eva Bergfelt
 Karl-Arne Holmsten as Hasse Nordgren
 Dagmar Ebbesen as 	Aunt Gullan
 Åke Ohberg as Fredrik Hall
 Elly Christiansson as 	Gunvor Hall
 Stina Hedberg as 	Mrs. Märta Bergfelt
 Hjördis Petterson as Miss Solaeng
 John Botvid as 	Theobald
 Åke Johansson as 	Willy
 Torsten Winge as 	Uncle John
 Anna-Lisa Baude as 	Nurse
 Hugo Björne as Kernell
 Gösta Bodin as 	Insurance salesman
 Julia Cæsar as 	Old lady
 Elsa Ebbesen as 	Hostess
 Georg Fernqvist as Older Man
 Sigge Fürst as Police constable
 Hilding Gavle as 	Prof. of Mathematics
 Greta Liming a s	Telephone Operator
 Börje Mellvig as 	Salesman
 Gunnar Olsson as 	Salesman
 Ruth Weijden as Aunt Ottilia
 Ragnar Widestedt as 	Doctor
 Carl-Gunnar Wingård as Fingal Syren

References

Bibliography 
 Wallengren, Ann-Kristin.  Welcome Home Mr Swanson: Swedish Emigrants and Swedishness on Film. Nordic Academic Press, 2014.

External links 
 

1941 films
Swedish comedy films
1941 comedy films
1940s Swedish-language films
Films directed by Ragnar Arvedson
1940s Swedish films